Death Resonance is the second compilation album by Swedish melodic death metal band Soilwork, released on 19 August 2016 via Nuclear Blast. The album contains two new songs as well as thirteen remastered versions of B-sides previously unreleased worldwide, including all tracks in Beyond the Infinite EP and bonus tracks in Stabbing the Drama, Sworn to a Great Divide, The Panic Broadcast and The Ride Majestic.  The album is the final Soilwork record to credit Dirk Verbeuren on drums.

Background
Frontman Björn "Speed" Strid commented on Death Resonance:

Track listing

Personnel

Soilwork 
 Björn "Speed" Strid – vocals
 Sylvain Coudret – guitars, bass
 David Andersson – guitars, bass
 Sven Karlsson – keyboards
 Dirk Verbeuren – drums

Soilwork 
 Björn "Speed" Strid – vocals
 Sylvain Coudret – guitars , bass 
 David Andersson – guitars , bass 
 Peter Wichers – guitars 
 Ola Frenning – guitars 
 Daniel Antonsson – guitars 
 Ola Flink – bass 
 Sven Karlsson – keyboards
 Dirk Verbeuren – drums

Production
 David Castillo – producer , engineering , mixing 
 Jens Bogren – producer , mixing , engineering 
 Johan Örnborg – producer assistance , mixing 
 Linus Corneliusson – producer assistance 
 Donal Fitsberg – producer assistance 
 Peter Wichers – producer , engineering 
 Daniel Bergstrand – producer , re-mixing 
 Devin Townsend – producer 
 Ola Frenning – producer 
 Klas Ideberg – producer 
 Peter Wildoer – producer 
 Sebastian Forslund – re-mixing 
 Örjan Örnkloo – producer 
 Thomas "PLEC" Johansson – mastering
 Mircea Gabriel Eftemie – artwork, layout

References

2016 compilation albums
Nuclear Blast albums
Soilwork albums